Frank Beall Ryan (born July 12, 1936) is a retired American football quarterback in the National Football League who played for the Los Angeles Rams (1958–1961), Cleveland Browns (1962–1968) and Washington Redskins (1969–1970). He led the Browns to their most recent National Football League title in 1964. Ryan was also a mathematician, serving as a faculty member at Case Western Reserve University from 1967 to 1974.

Early years
Ryan played football while attending R. L. Paschal High School in Fort Worth, Texas. He was recruited by college coaches from across the country, including Bear Bryant, and he was admitted to Yale University. Ryan declared a major in physics at Rice University, becoming the first in his family not to go to Yale. He was unable to establish himself during the course of his collegiate career, splitting time behind center with King Hill, who was receiving most of the snaps.

Given his desire to obtain a Ph.D., Ryan originally decided not to play professional football after the Los Angeles Rams chose him in the fifth round of the 1958 NFL Draft.  He changed his mind after he was able to enroll at both UCLA and the University of California, Berkeley in pursuit of an advanced degree. Ryan then transferred back to Rice, where he studied during the off-season.

NFL career

Los Angeles Rams
Ryan spent the first four years of his career primarily in a reserve capacity, making $12,000 per year. He did start a handful of games in competition with Billy Wade and Zeke Bratkowski. In 1961, he and future Hall of Famer Ollie Matson connected on a 96-yard touchdown reception, establishing a new team record. However, after sitting on the bench for the last four games of the 1961 season, Ryan stormed into the dressing room and threatened General Manager Elroy Hirsch that he was going to quit football if he were not traded. He became part of a multi-player deal with the Cleveland Browns on July 12, 1962, his 26th birthday, as the arrival of highly touted newcomer Roman Gabriel made Ryan expendable.

Cleveland Browns

1962–1963
Acquired to back up starting quarterback Jim Ninowski, Ryan moved into the starting slot on October 28 when Ninowski broke his collarbone while being tackled by Pittsburgh Steelers' defensive lineman Eugene "Big Daddy" Lipscomb.  With no other candidates to compete with, Ryan established his leadership and held on to the starting role for much of the next six seasons.  In his first full season as a starter, 1963, Ryan threw for 2,026 yards and 25 touchdowns with only 13 interceptions, helping the Browns to a 10–4 record.  Thirteen of those touchdowns went to Gary Collins, who tied for the league lead in receiving touchdowns that year.

1964
In 1964, Ryan established himself as one of the league's best passers.  He threw for 2,404 yards and repeated his 1963 performance by completing 25 touchdown passes, which was enough to lead the league.  Ryan had excellent company on the Browns offense: fullback Jim Brown; wide receivers Gary Collins and Paul Warfield; and an outstanding offensive line which included Dick Schafrath, John Morrow, John Wooten, Monte Clark, and future Hall of Famer Gene Hickerson.  But Ryan was also a clutch performer during the Browns' memorable 10–3–1 season.  Needing a win in the December 12 regular season finale against the New York Giants to clinch a berth in the NFL title game, Ryan completed 12 of 13 passes for five touchdowns and ran for a sixth touchdown in the 52–20 win.  Two weeks later in the championship game against the Baltimore Colts, Ryan hit Collins for three touchdowns to win the title, 27–0.

Ryan was rewarded for his performance with the first of three straight Pro Bowl appearances.  Unfortunately, on the first play of the second half, he suffered a severe shoulder injury in the game after the combined 800-pound trio of Packer Willie Davis, Lion Roger Brown and Colt Gino Marchetti converged on the signal caller.  Speculation persists to this day that Marchetti went out of his way to injure Ryan due to the perception that the quarterback ran up the score in the championship, with Marchetti's statement that he wanted "one more shot" at Ryan also fueling the rumors.  However, a study of the film by Cleveland coaches in the weeks after the game exonerated Marchetti.

After winning the championship, Art Modell raised his salary $25,000, up from about $18,000 per season.

1965
Ryan's numbers dropped in 1965, throwing for only 1,751 yards and 18 touchdowns.  While his shoulder had completely healed, a sore elbow in training camp and an injured arch early in the regular season played a role in his completing fewer than half of his passes during the campaign.  Those struggles resulted in a continuing cool relationship with Browns' fans, who booed him often during home contests.  Part of Ryan's decline can also be traced to the absence of second-year wide receiver Paul Warfield, who missed much of the season after suffering a double fracture of the collarbone in the team's first exhibition game.

1966
In 1966, he bounced back with a superb season, leading the league with 29 touchdown passes and finishing second with 2,976 yards despite playing with intense pain.  Ryan's output helped alleviate the absence of the legendary Jim Brown, who had retired prior to the start of training camp. His 29 touchdown passes in 14 games ranks second in Browns franchise history to Brian Sipe, who got 30 in a 16-game 1980 season.

1967
On January 25, 1967, Ryan underwent an operation to repair the remaining effects of his injury.  The surgery eliminated the pain, but also affected his throwing motion.  In the 1967 season opener, Ryan's injury woes continued as he sprained both ankles in a 21–14 loss to the Dallas Cowboys.  Battling through that malady, along with shoulder and knee troubles, Ryan led the team to a 9–5 record to reach the playoffs. The season would see Ryan suffering a concussion from a head-to-head collision with Dick Butkus. He was knocked out in the second-quarter but came back to throw three touchdown passes in the third quarter to will his team to a 24–0 victory. Ryan credits this collision for the cervical disc replacement he underwent after retiring.

1968
Ryan's tenure as the Browns' starting quarterback came to an abrupt end following a 1–2 start to the 1968 season.  Browns' head coach Blanton Collier replaced Ryan with Bill Nelsen, who went on to lead the team to a division title.  The official conclusion of Ryan's time with the Browns came on September 9, 1969, when he was released, but new Redskins' coach Vince Lombardi quickly signed Ryan as a backup.

Washington Redskins
Despite throwing only one pass during the 1969 season, Ryan returned for the last of his 13 years in the NFL in 1970 before officially announcing his retirement on April 13, 1971. With his accurate throwing arm, his 14.7 yards per completion still ranks as one of the all-time leaders.

Academic career
Ryan attended graduate school during the first part of his playing career, and in 1965, he earned his Ph.D. from Rice. He worked for seven postgraduate years under G. R. MacLane, a leading geometric-function theorist, and produced the dissertation  "Characterization of the Set of Asymptotic Values of a Function Holomorphic in the Unit Disc". In 1966, Ryan published two fundamental papers on the set of asymptotic values of a function holomorphic in the unit disc in Duke Mathematical Journal.

Ryan received the Golden Plate Award of the American Academy of Achievement in 1965.

He started teaching at Rice during his career and, during his time with the Browns, he became an assistant professor at the Case Institute of Technology in February 1967. Ryan had a full teaching load, which includes undergraduate and graduate courses, and conducting research in complex analysis. While at training camp, Ryan taught math in the morning and went to football practice in the afternoon. Ryan taught his last course at Case Western Reserve in the spring of 1971. He was promoted to associate professor that summer. After taking a leave of absence for the next three years, he resigned his faculty position in 1974.

Ryan learned computer programming and software through the Chi Corp., Case Western Reserve's then newly launched private computer company. He compiled advanced statistics to apply what he learned to football. The Browns were shown his results and liked the project but didn't offer the extra cash to move it forward.

Ryan's second career was fodder for many jokes by sportswriters.  Red Smith wrote that the Browns' offense consisted of a quarterback who understood Einstein's theory of relativity and ten teammates who didn't know there was one.  Ryan was somewhat put off by the focus on his academic life, as he considered himself to be a regular football player.

Ryan considers Sir Edward Collingwood, an expert in meromorphic function and the theory of cluster sets, and Arthur J. Lohwater, the former editor of Mathematical Reviews, as mentors. Ryan has an Erdős number of 3.

Post-NFL career
Soon after his retirement from the Redskins, Ryan remained in the nation's capital when he was named director of information services for the U.S. House of Representatives. While there, he helped advance the computer age in politics by playing an integral role in establishing the body's first electronic voting system. This enabled voting procedures that usually ran for 45 minutes to be shortened to around 15 minutes. By the time he left the post, the office had an annual budget of $8 million with a staff of 225.

Ryan resigned that post to become athletic director and lecturer in mathematics at Yale University on March 7, 1977. Ryan served in that position for ten years before resigning to become the school's associate vice president for institutional planning.

He was a member of the Rice board of governors from 1972 to 1976 and was recognized as a distinguished alumnus in 1987. Ryan became vice president for external affairs at Rice in August 1990, increasing annual gifts to the university to a three-year average of $32.8 million for the fiscal years 1992–94 from $21.4 million for the fiscal years 1988–90. In 1995, he resigned his post as vice president for external affairs at Rice, owing to differences with President Malcolm Gillis concerning the future course of external affairs. Ryan ended his institutional career as a professor of mathematics, and professor of computational and applied mathematics at Rice.

Ryan was president and chief executive officer of Contex Electronics, which designed and manufactured cable and interconnect products for the computer and communications industries. Ryan also served as director for America West Airlines, Sequoia Voting Systems, and of Danielson Holding Corporation. He was an advisory director of United Medical Care Inc.

Now retired, Ryan lives on 78 acres of heavily forested land in Grafton, Vermont, with his wife, Joan, a retired sportswriter and nationally syndicated columnist for The Washington Post. His wife was one of the first female sportswriters to ever grace a locker room (not to be confused with another sportswriter named Joan Ryan) and also wrote a book on women in sports. The two Texans met in college, fell in love with Vermont while Ryan was on staff at Yale, and have been married since their senior year at Rice.

In retirement, he now runs a sophisticated self-designed program that helps micro-analyze  statistical behavior of the up-and-down pricing movement that underlies the pricing behavior of the futures market. He is also doing work on Oppermann's conjecture about the distribution of prime numbers.

Statistics
Ryan ranks fourth all-time among Browns quarterbacks with 13,499 passing yards and second behind Brian Sipe with 134 touchdowns.  His 81.43 passer rating is fifth-best, behind Milt Plum, Baker Mayfield, Otto Graham, and Bernie Kosar.

Ryan's career numbers (including years with the Rams and Redskins): 1,090 completions in 2,133 attempts for 16,044 yards, 149 touchdowns and 111 interceptions. Ryan also rushed for 1,358 yards and six touchdowns on 310 carries.

See also

 Colin Allred - former NFL linebacker who became a lawyer and US Representative
 Tommy Casanova - former NFL player who became an ophthalmologist
 Dennis Claridge – former NFL quarterback who became an orthodontist
 Dan Doornink – former NFL running back who became a medical doctor
 Laurent Duvernay-Tardif – current NFL player who earned a medical degree while playing in the league
 John Frank - Super Bowl winning SF 49er who became a NY City based plastic surgeon
 Joel Makovicka – former NFL fullback who became a doctor of physical therapy
 Bill McColl - former NFL player who became an orthopedic surgeon, father of Milt McColl
 Milt McColl - former NFL linebacker who became a medical doctor
 Alan Page - Hall of Fame defensive who became a Minnesota Supreme Court Justice 
 Myron Rolle – former NFL defensive back who was also a Rhodes scholar and neurosurgeon
 John Urschel – former NFL player and mathematician who was a PhD candidate while playing in the league
 Byron White - former NFL running back who became a US Supreme Court Justice
 Rob Zatechka – former NFL guard who became a medical doctor
 Andrew Luck - former NFL quarterback who graduated from Stanford with an engineering degree

References

Other sources
 Grossi, Tony (2004). Tales from the Browns Sideline. (Champaign, Ill.): Sports Publishing LLC. 
 Stewart, Todd, ed. (2004) Cleveland Browns 2004 Media Guide. New York: National Communications Group

External links
 
 
 Frank Ryan's dissertation

1936 births
Living people
American football quarterbacks
20th-century American mathematicians
21st-century American mathematicians
Case Western Reserve University faculty
Cleveland Browns players
Los Angeles Rams players
Rice Owls football players
Rice University alumni
Rice University faculty
Washington Redskins players
Yale Bulldogs athletic directors
Yale University faculty
Employees of the United States House of Representatives
Eastern Conference Pro Bowl players
Players of American football from Fort Worth, Texas